The first season of One Tree Hill, an American teen drama television series created by Mark Schwahn, began airing on September 23, 2003 on The WB television network. The season concluded on May 11, 2004, after 22 episodes.

The series premiere was watched by 2.5 million viewers and achieved a 1.9 Adults 18–49 rating on September 23, 2003. However, the following week it rose to 3.3 million viewers and a 2.4 demo, becoming only one of three shows to rise in its second episode in the 2003–2004 TV season.

Warner Home Video released the complete first season, under the title of One Tree Hill: The Complete First Season, on January 25, 2005, as a six-disc boxed set.

Overview
The first season follows Lucas Scott, a junior, as he joins his high school basketball team and forges a relationship with his half-brother Nathan Scott, while also coming to terms with who he is and who his father, Dan, is. The season mainly explores into the boys' love lives as they form connections with characters such as Peyton Sawyer, Haley James, and Brooke Davis, while most of these kids' parents confront their own pasts in order to move on.

Cast and characters

Regular
 Chad Michael Murray as Lucas Scott (22 episodes)
 James Lafferty as Nathan Scott (22 episodes)
 Hilarie Burton as Peyton Sawyer (22 episodes)
 Bethany Joy Lenz as Haley James (22 episodes)
 Paul Johansson as Dan Scott (22 episodes)
 Sophia Bush as Brooke Davis (21 episodes)
 Barry Corbin as Whitey Durham (19 episodes)
 Craig Sheffer as Keith Scott (22 episodes)
 Moira Kelly as Karen Roe (18 episodes)
 Barbara Alyn Woods as Deb Scott (episode 13 onwards; recurring ep. 4-12) (19 episodes)

Recurring
 Brett Claywell as Tim Smith (20 episodes)
 Bryan Greenberg as Jake Jagielski (13 episodes)
 Lee Norris as Mouth McFadden (12 episodes)
 Cullen Moss as Junk Moretti (7 episodes)
 Vaughn Wilson as Fergie Thompson (7 episodes) 
 Antwon Tanner as Antwon "Skills" Taylor (6 episodes)
 Bevin Prince as Bevin Mirskey (6 episodes)
 Emmanuelle Vaugier as Nicki (6 episodes)
 Thomas Ian Griffith as Larry Sawyer (5 episodes)
Sarah Edwards as Theresa (4 episodes)

Episodes

Reception

DVD release
The DVD release of season one was released after the season has completed broadcast on television. It has been released in Regions 1, 2 and 4. As well as every episode from the season, the DVD release features bonus material such as audio commentaries on some episodes from the creator and cast, deleted scenes, gag reels and behind-the-scenes featurettes. The words "The WB Presents" were printed on the packaging before the "One Tree Hill" title, although they were not included on international releases as The WB was not the broadcaster.

References

One Tree Hill (TV series) seasons
2003 American television seasons
2004 American television seasons